Penisimani Angelo Fonua Siolaa (born ) is a Tongan male weightlifter, competing in the 69 kg category and representing Tonga at international competitions. He participated at the 2014 Commonwealth Games in the 69 kg event.

Major competitions

References

1994 births
Living people
Tongan male weightlifters
Place of birth missing (living people)
Weightlifters at the 2014 Commonwealth Games
Commonwealth Games competitors for Tonga